John Brian Driscoll (born July 17, 1946) is an American writer and politician who served in the Montana House of Representatives from 1973 to 1979.

Early life and education 
Driscoll was born in Los Angeles, California. He was raised in Montana and attended Hamilton High School. Driscoll earned a Bachelor of Arts degree in political science from Gonzaga University, Master of Arts in international affairs from Columbia University, Master of Public Administration from Harvard University, and Master of Business Administration from the University of Montana.

Career 
Driscoll served in the Army National Guard for 28 years, including strategic intelligence missions in the West Indies and Africa.

Driscoll was elected to the Montana House of Representatives in 1972 and served as House Majority Leader from 1975 to 1977. He served as Speaker from 1977 to 1979. In 1978, at the age of 32, he ran for the United States Senate, but finished a distant third in the Democratic primary to Max Baucus and Paul G. Hatfield. From 1981 to 1992, Driscoll served as a public service commissioner. He later served as a joint education planner for the Joint Chiefs of Staff in the 1990s. Eventually returning to Montana, Driscoll operated a small book-selling business out of his home in Helena.

In 2014, he ran to succeed Steve Daines in Montana's at-large congressional district but lost the Democratic nomination to John Lewis. He was a candidate for U.S. Senate in the 2020 election, losing to incumbent Steve Daines in the Republican primary.

References

External links

1946 births
School of International and Public Affairs, Columbia University alumni
Gonzaga University alumni
Living people
Harvard Kennedy School alumni
Montana Republicans
Montana Democrats
Politicians from Helena, Montana
Politicians from Los Angeles
Speakers of the Montana House of Representatives
University of Montana alumni
Candidates in the 2020 United States Senate elections